Sadasivan KM Nambisan aka Sadu is a Indi-pop singer, music composer, lyricist, producer and a founder member of Pop and Rock band. "The Aryans". The Aryans is known for its romantic song ‘Aankhon mein tera hi chehra’ and ‘Ye hawa’. Sadu released his song ‘Hor Kinne Suboot’ in Feb, 2020.

References

Indian male singer-songwriters